Croton barahonensis is a species of plant of the genus Croton and the family of Euphorbiaceae, present in the Dominican Republic on the island of Hispaniola.

References

External links
 

barahonensis
Flora of the Dominican Republic
Plants described in 1912
Flora without expected TNC conservation status